Samy D. is a Tel Aviv based ceramic artist.

Art career
The Samy D. studio located in Tel Aviv's Neve Zedek neighborhood. His works appear in design and fashion journals. Breakfast in EL AL Israel Airlines first class cabin is served on Samy D. dishes. Samy D. produces ceramics for commercial use and one-off artworks thrown on a potter's wheel, sometimes decorated with 14 carat gold. One series of pieces are etched with micrographic passages from the Book of Genesis, some in Hebrew, some from the Vulgate.  The text begins in even swirls but becomes "twisted and warped," at the verse where man is created.

Awards and recognition
In 2009, Samy D. won first prize at the Alix De Rothschild Crafts Awards, an annual art prize given by the Alix de Rothschild Foundation in memory of Baroness Lavinia Anne Alix De Rothschild by a London-based jury to an Israel artist  for exceptional work in any in glass, jewellery, ceramics, textiles, or metal.

Exhibitions
Genesis – Periscope Gallery, Tel-Aviv, Israel
SAMY D.  – VeredArt Gallery, East Hampton, New York and museums.
The PMA Craft show – Philadelphia Museum of Art, Philadelphia, PA USA
The 5th Biennale for Israeli Ceramic Art, Tel-Aviv, Israel, 2007
SOFA – Chicago, IL - by the courtesy of AIDA
Imagination – Israeli Art Exhibition, Tel-Aviv, Israel
'Nisui Kelim #5' – Bikurei Haitim Center, Tel-Aviv, Israel
Imagination – Israeli Art Exhibition, Tel-Aviv, Israel
True Colors 2009 – 100 Identities – Shorashim Art Gallery, Tel-Aviv

Collections
Kamm Teapot Foundation – Sparta, NC USA
Kaufman Collection – Palm Beach, FL USA
Rudin Collection – New York, NY USA
Ran Rahav Collection – Tel Aviv, Israel

References

External links
 Samy D.'s blog
 
 http://sofaexpo.com/

Year of birth missing (living people)
Living people
Israeli ceramists
Israeli male sculptors
21st-century Israeli male artists
21st-century ceramists